All Hail is a 2022 Argentine comedy-drama film directed by Marcos Carnevale and written by Nicolás Giacobone and Fernando Balmayor. Starring Guillermo Francella, Norman Briski and Romina Fernandes.

Plot
After failing to predict a destructive hailstorm, a famous meteorologist flees to his hometown and soon finds himself on a journey of self-discovery.

Cast
 Guillermo Francella as Miguel Flores
 Peto Menahem as Luis
 Romina Fernandes as Carla
 Martín Seefeld as Gustavo
 Nicolás Scarpino as Maxi
 Laura Fernández as Mery Oliva
 Norman Briski as Don José
 Eugenia Guerty as Marisa
 Viviana Saccone as Jimena
 Pompeyo Audivert as Alonso
 Horacio Fernández as Bernardo

References

External links
 
 

2022 films
2022 comedy-drama films
Argentine comedy-drama films
2020s Spanish-language films
Films set in Buenos Aires
Films shot in Buenos Aires
Spanish-language Netflix original films
2020s Argentine films